The Gulf of Patras (Patraikós Kólpos) is a branch of the Ionian Sea in Western Greece. On the east, it is closed by the Strait of Rion between capes Rio and Antirrio, near the Rio-Antirrio bridge, that is the entrance of the Gulf of Corinth. On the west, it is bounded by a line from Oxeia island to Cape Araxos. To the north it is bounded by the shore of Aetolia-Acarnania in continental Greece, and to the south by Achaea in the Peloponnese peninsula.

The port city of Patras lies to the southeast and is the only major port on the gulf. It serves ferries to Ancona and Brindisi in Italy and to Cephalonia. On the northern shore Missolonghi, also has a port. The old ports of Rio and Antirrio lie at the east end of the Gulf; there is a ferry service between them which complements the traffic over the Rio-Antirio bridge. The gulf is rich in fish and molluscs, including sea snails and clams.

History
A number of major naval battles took place in the Gulf of Patras: the Battle of Patras in 1772, and the Battle of Lepanto in 1571, one of the largest naval battles ever fought. Lepanto itself lies further east, in the Gulf of Corinth.

Cities and towns

The following major cities and towns are situated along the Gulf of Patras (from west to east):
North side, Aetolia-Acarnania: Aitoliko, Missolonghi, Antirrio
South side, Achaea: Kato Achaia, Vrachnaiika, Roitika, Paralia, Patras, Rio

Rivers and streams
The following rivers flow into the Gulf of Patras (from west to east):
North side: 
 Evinos
South side:
 Peiros
 Panagitsa
 Glafkos
 Meilichos
 Charadros

External links

 Satellite image of the East Ionian and the Gulf of Patras
 Biomonitoring of Gulf of Patras, N. Peloponnesus, Greece. Application of a biomarker suite including evaluation of translation efficiency in Mytilus galloprovincialis cells

Patras
Patras
Geography of Patras
Landforms of Achaea
Landforms of Aetolia-Acarnania